Arthur Byron Damude (15 October 1889 – 15 September 1941) was a Liberal party member of the House of Commons of Canada. He was born in Thorold Township, Ontario and became an insurance agent by career and also served as reeve of Fonthill, Ontario from 1923 to 1929.

Damude made an unsuccessful attempt to win an Ontario provincial legislature seat in 1929.

He was first elected to Parliament at the Welland riding in the 1935 general election after an unsuccessful campaign there in 1930. Damude was re-elected in 1940, but died of asthma complications at his home in Fonthill on 15 September 1941 during his term in the 19th Canadian Parliament. Damude was predeceased by his wife and is survived by one son.

References

External links
 

1889 births
1941 deaths
Respiratory disease deaths in Ontario
Deaths from asthma
Liberal Party of Canada MPs
Members of the House of Commons of Canada from Ontario
Mayors of places in Ontario